The Government Alliance is the name given to the Chilean political coalition founded on 6 November 2022 after a meeting called by the President of the Republic, Gabriel Boric, held at the Palace of Cerro Castillo, where the presidents of the political parties, parliamentarians and authorities that are part of the government.

The coalition is made up of the member parties of the two coalitions that supported his candidacy and entered his administration: Apruebo Dignidad and Democratic Socialism. The alliance agreed to have a common and rotating spokesperson, the first spokeswoman for the coalition being the president of the Socialist Party, Paulina Vodanovic.

History 

In March 2021, the primary elections of the Apruebo Dignidad pact, a coalition made up of the Broad Front and Chile Digno, take place, in which the Broad Front candidate Gabriel Boric is the winner, for which he competed as the sole candidate of Apruebo Dignidad in the first round of the presidential elections, in which he would get the pass to the runoff.

After the defeat of the Christian Democrat candidate Yasna Provoste, of the New Social Pact —a coalition formed that year for the elections, which brought together the parties from the Concertación and Nueva Mayoría, which governed the country for 24 years—, this bloc joins to the candidacy of the standard-bearer of Apruebo Dignidad. Finally, Boric achieves victory in the runoff.

After the victory in the presidential elections and given the way in which the congress was composed after the parliamentary elections —Apruebo Dignidad only managed to elect 37 of the 150 deputies and 5 of the 50 senators—, Gabriel Boric includes in the government the parties that made up the New Social Pact coalition, with the exception of the Christian Democratic Party. These parties would later adopt the nomination of Democratic Socialism.

Thus, the government of Gabriel Boric has been supported by these two political blocs —or “two souls”, as the local press has called them—: Democratic Socialism and Apruebo Dignidad. The difficult coexistence of both coalitions within the ruling party, added to the defeat of the option supported by the government in the plebiscite on 4 September, gave rise to the political committee on 17 October 2022, calling an official conclave , with the purpose of analyzing the course that the government should adopt, which materialized on 6 November 2022 in the Presidential Palace of Cerro Castillo, where the leaders of the parties that are members of the ruling parties met. Since then, the coalition has met regularly to form an electoral and content committee, and has replicated the first national conclave in various regions of the country.

Composition

See also 

 2021 Chilean general election

References 

Political parties established in 2022
Political party alliances in Chile